The HJ-9, HongJian-9, military designation AFT-9, is an advanced, third-generation, man-portable or vehicle-mounted anti-tank missile system deployed by the People's Liberation Army Ground Force.

History and development
The development of HJ-9 commenced in the early 1980s, with the development finished in the late 1990s. The weapon was officially unveiled to the public on a military parade in 1999.

The missile was developed by China North Industries Corporation (Norinco), and one of the chief designers was Yang Chunming (杨春铭). It is externally similar in appearance to the Israeli MAPATS (man-portable anti-tank system) and South African ZT3 Ingwe anti-tank missile, however, no evidence is found between their potential technological link.

Design
Claimed armor penetration is 1,200mm, which is greater than the HJ-8. The missile may be fitted with high-explosive or thermal effect warheads against non-armored point targets, bunkers, and fortifications. The missile is compatible with various thermal imaging sights and can be mounted on the AFT-9 Missile Carrier.

In 2005, Norinco revealed HJ-9A in various public events. The HJ-9A was in service with the Chinese armed forces as of 2005. Unlike HJ-9, the newer system used semi-active millimeter wave radar guidance. The HJ-9A launcher was mostly observed being mounted on a tripod with an integrated radar system and was demonstrated by Norinco on a NJ2046 utility vehicle. The HJ-9A can also be mounted on trucks, armored personnel carriers, and other light utility vehicles.

Norinco also revealed a further-developed version of the HJ-9A with laser guidance, designated HJ-9B.

Operators
  
 People's Liberation Army Ground Force — 450 AFT-9 Missile Carrier estimated in service as of 2020.

See also
Anti-tank guided missile
Related development
HJ-8 - wire-guided anti-tank missile system
HJ-10 - fiber-optic wire-guided anti-tank missile system
HJ-12 - man-portable infrared-homing anti-tank missile system
Missiles of comparable design
MAPATS
ZT3 Ingwe
9M133 Kornet

References

 HJ-9 ATM
 (JIW) Jones, Richard D. and Ness, Leland (eds.), Jane's Infantry Weapons 2007-2008, Coulsdon: Jane's Information Group Ltd., 2007.
 (JAA) Foss, Christopher F. (ed.), Jane's Armour and Artillery 2007-2008, London: Jane's Publishing Company Ltd., 2008.

Anti-tank guided missiles of the People's Republic of China
Weapons of the People's Republic of China
Guided missiles of the People's Republic of China
Air-to-surface missiles
Military equipment introduced in the 1990s